Formic is an adjective describing ants, from the Latin formica.

Formic may also refer to:

 Formic acid, a chemical compound secreted by ants for defense
 The Formics, or Buggers, an alien species in the Ender's Game novel series by Orson Scott Card